Go Princess Go is a 2015 Chinese web series produced by LeTV and adapted from the novel of the same name by Xian Chen. The series stars Zhang Tianai, Sheng Yilun, Yu Menglong, Jiang Qilin and Guo Junchen in the lead roles. It premiered in December 2015 with 35 episodes.
The show incorporates various themes such as time travel, bisexuality and gender identity. A third of the show was censored in China.

Synopsis 
A modern playboy travels back in time 1,000 years to find himself in the body of a royal princess. As a man inside a woman's body, he enjoys flirting and touching his husband's concubines with little impunity. Once having discovered his more feminine side, he truly falls in love with his husband.

The show has three endings: the original, and the series has two alternate endings. One of them was filmed long after the first two.
It is a parody of historical dramas.

Cast

Main
Zhang Tianai as Zhang Pengpeng (Female)
Zhang Zhiyuan as Zhang Peng (Male)
A modern playboy travels back in time 1,000 years and finds himself in the body of the crown princess. 
Sheng Yilun as Qi Sheng
Crown Prince. An intelligent and cunning man of few words. 
Yu Menglong as Qi Han
Ninth Prince. A gentle and sophisticated man with intricate and complex thoughts. He goes against Qi Sheng in political affairs, as well as compete for Zhang Pengpeng's love with him.
Jiang Qilin as Prince Zhao
A man who appears foolish but hides a complex train of thought. He appears to be at odd with Qi Sheng, but actually works together with him to bring down Qi Han. He marries Lu Li.
Guo Junchen as Yang Yan
Son of a general. Qi Han's closest aide.

Supporting
Hai Ling as Lu Li
Zhang Pengpeng's personal attendant. A bright, straightforward and loyal girl.
An Yongchang as Jiang Yingyue 
Prince Zhao's wife. She has an illicit relationship with Qi Sheng.
Chen Shi as Empress Dowager 
Peng Yuchang as Eunuch Qiang 
Qi Sheng's attendant. He likes Lu Li.
Zai Yishu as Huang Liangyuan
Cheng Xiaojin as Chen Liangdi  
Zheng Shuhuai as Wang Shaoxun 
Hu Yue as Li Chengxun 
Sun Fengzheng as Eunuch Li – A 
Sun Fengzhao as Eunuch Li – B 
Chen Hao as Yang Yu 
Yang Yan's father.
Chai Wei as Zhang Lingling  
Zhang Pengpeng's niece. Yang Yan's wife.
Xu Yiwen as Zhang's mother 
Zhang Chen as Doctor Song 
Ben Jieming as Guard Li 
Wang Wenqiang as Guard 
Zhou Le as Guard
Liu Yining as Deliveryman

Production
The drama's adaptation rights were bought in 2012 by producer Gan Wei, and pre-production started in 2014.  The series is directed by Lu Hao Ji Ji and written by Qin Shuang, who kept the main structure of the storyline but made considerable changes to better fit the screenplay adaptation and increase the pacing and fluidity. Due to the short production time of 70 days, insufficient time and funds were used to prepare the props, and product placements have to be inserted into the show.

The series began filming at Xiangshan Movie & Television Town in August 2015.

Soundtrack

Reception 
Despite its low budget of 20 million yuan (US$3 million) and cast of amateur actors, the show became highly successful and was termed as a "viral internet comedy". The show has generated over $1.5 million (41 million yuan) in profit, 50,000 paid subscribers, 2.2 million new memberships, and had over 2.6 billion views in total. At one point the show  was a No. 1 trending topic on Weibo for 10 consecutive days.

Critics attribute the success of the show to its short length of 30 minutes, thus appealing to younger audience with shorter attention span. Also, the show was broadcast online and allowed viewers to post comments and discuss the storyline with others, making the watching experience more interactive. The transgender angle also makes the series more topical, helping break down barriers in discussing gender change and homosexuality. Oppositely, the series has been criticized for being "lousy" and appealing to "low-brow tastes".

However, it has suffered from interference by Chinese censors. The show was taken offline on January 20, 2016 following a request by the State Administration of Press, Publication, Radio, Film and Television. It has been speculated that this is due to the censors' dislike of sexual scenes, vulgar language and time-travel themes. The show was made available again around January 28, 2016, with a number of cuts, roughly about a third of the show – "seven to eight minutes in each episode".  As of 2016 LeTV was considering a movie sequel to the show.

Awards and nominations

Remake
In June 2018, it was announced that the drama will have a Korean remake which will be helmed by Fox Networks Group Asia Pacific and Endeavor China together with YG STUDIOPLEX and LYD Networks. Two years since the announcement, it was picked up by local pay TV channel tvN but only YG STUDIOPLEX and LYD Networks (which became an investor instead of a co-production role due to financial difficulty) went on for the project with new production partners, CJ ENM's Studio Dragon and independent company Crave Works.

The adaptation, titled Mr. Queen, aired on tvN on December 12, 2020.

References

External links
 
Official YouTube trailer

2015 Chinese television series debuts
2016 Chinese television series endings
Chinese time travel television series
Chinese romantic comedy television series
Chinese-language television shows
Time travel in television
Censored television series
Chinese web series
Television shows based on Chinese novels
Television series by LeEco
2015 web series debuts
Television censorship in China
Chinese LGBT-related web series